Live FM is a privately owned urban, lifestyle radio station, which focuses on entertainment and sports content in the talk show genre. Live FM broadcasts from Feroah Avenue, Adabraka, Accra, the capital of Ghana, on 91.9 FM and online.  The station is owned by former Ghana Finance Minister Kwabena Duffuor.

References

External links 
 Official website

Radio stations in Ghana
Greater Accra Region
Mass media in Accra